The 2018 Wandsworth Council election took place on 3 May 2018 to elect members of Wandsworth Council in England. This was on the same day as other local elections.

The Conservative Party retained control of the council with a reduced majority, although the Labour Party made 7 gains and won the popular vote across the borough by a narrow margin.

Overall results

The Conservatives retained control of the council, winning 33 seats (down 8). Labour won 26 (up 7), while 1 seat was won by an independent, Malcolm Grimston.

|}

Ward results

Malcolm Grimston was elected in 2014 as a Conservative, before becoming an Independent. Changes are shown from the 2014 election.

2018–2022 by-elections

References

2018
2018 London Borough council elections